Pedro Arce Latapí (born 25 November 1991) is a Mexican professional footballer who plays as an attacking midfielder.

Career
Born in Saltillo, Arce moved to Barcelona to play for Fundación Marcet at age 18. Shortly after, Arce signed with Swiss semi-professional FC Baulmes where he appeared in 10 league matches. He signed his first professional contract with Greek club Veria, and after loans to Giannitsa and Kavala he returned to the senior side.

Arce made his professional debut for Veria in a 2–0 home win against Niki Volos. He became the first player of his home city to play in a European championship. He made his second appearance in a 1–1 home draw against Kalloni He made his third appearance against OFI Crete in a 4–1 home win.

After making four appearances on his second spell at Veria, Arce was offered a one-year contract extension, an offer that he accepted. His contract was set to expire on 30 June 2016.

On 15 June 2017, Mexican side Club América announced they had signed Arce.

On 6 February 2019, he signed with Superleague club Panionios On 2 November 2019, Arce's first goal for the team gave them a 66th-minute lead at home to Aris, despite having had a man sent off; the match ended 1–1. On 30 November 2019, he scored in an emphatic 3–0 home win against Panetolikos.

Honours
América
Liga MX: Apertura 2018

References

1991 births
Living people
Mexican expatriate footballers
Footballers from Coahuila
Mexican footballers
Super League Greece players
Veria F.C. players
Kavala F.C. players
Club América footballers
Panionios F.C. players
Expatriate footballers in Greece
Sportspeople from Saltillo
Association football midfielders